Toxi is a 1952 West German drama film directed by Robert A. Stemmle and starring Elfie Fiegert, Paul Bildt and Johanna Hofer. The film's release came as the first wave of children born to black Allied servicemen and white German mothers entered school.

It was shot at the Wandsbek Studios in Hamburg. Elfie Fiegert was selected to play Toxi after a mass audition held in Munich. Publicity for the film emphasised the similarities between her own story and that of Toxi. The film was the eighth most popular release at the West German box office in 1952. The name Toxi became widely used as shorthand in the German media  when referring to Afro-Germans and their social circumstances.

Plot
The melodrama, film begins with a young Afro-German girl being left at the doorsteps of the Rose family—white middle-class Germans—assembled for a birthday party. Initially, most family members treat the young girl with relatively welcome arms as they believe she is only giving a performance as a birthday surprise from an aunt. The family later discovers a suitcase that was left on the doorsteps and realize that the young girl, Toxi, has in fact been abandoned. Once the family learns that Toxi has been abandoned there is a shift in feelings regarding their acceptance of her; the possibility of the girl spending more time at the home than was expected forces members of the family to confront their racism. 
One character in particular, Uncle Theodor—the Roses' eldest daughter's husband—is very unsettled by the idea of having Toxi stay in his white household: he does not want Toxi to interact with his two daughters who are about the same age as Toxi. Unlike the other children featured in the film, Toxi acts very differently. She is always on her best behavior as her manners and maturity level are well beyond her age. Due to Toxi's mature behavior and her inherent goodness Uncle Theodor eventually realizes that he has made a mistake with his discrimination towards her. 
By the end of the film, the entire family has approved of Toxi. However, Toxi does not stay with the family, as her father—a former American soldier—shows up at their house to find Toxi and take her back to the States with him.

Cast
 Elfie Fiegert as Toxi
 Paul Bildt as Grossvater Rose 
 Johanna Hofer as Grossmutter Helene 
 Ingeborg Körner as Herta Rose 
 Carola Höhn as Charlotte Jenrich 
 Wilfried Seyferth as Theodor Jenrich 
 Sylvia Hermann as Ilse 
 Karin Purschke as Susi 
 Elisabeth Flickenschildt as Tante Wally 
 Rainer Penkert as Robert Peters 
 Ernst Waldow as Ubelhack 
 Erika von Thellmann as Frau Übelhack 
 Willy Maertens as Kriminal-Inspektor Plaukart 
 Lotte Brackebusch as Frau Berstel 
 Al Hoosmann as James R. Spencer 
 Gustl Busch as Anna 
 Julia Fjorsen as Fanny 
 Katharina Brauren as Vorsteherin 
 Gertrud Prey as Fursorgeschwester 
 Ursula V. Bose as Krankenschwester 
 Leila Negra as Singer 
 Renate Feuereisen as Frau im Wohnwagen

Significance of Uncle Theodor

Of all the characters within Toxi, Theodor Jenrich is one of the most overtly racist figures for much of the film. This becomes clear in his strong objections to the idea of his children growing up around Toxi and his repeated attempts to get her out of the house.
This antagonistic approach towards Toxi directly contrasts the heartwarming relationships Toxi has with Grandfather Rose, his younger daughter Herta and her soon-to-be fiancé Robert Peters. Where Uncle Theodor spends much of his time attempting to find a way to rid himself of Toxi, Grandfather Rose, Herta and Robert reach out to Toxi, engage with her and work to establish a more genuine relationship.
Through the juxtaposition of these relationships, the film demonstrates its intention of characterizing racial intolerance and the problematic ways in which different generations interacted with communities of color as issues unique the Nazi generation. Theodor's struggle with his racism and references to the Rassenprobleme further accentuate the linkage of racial intolerance with the Nazi era and isolate this to his generation. Such isolation ultimately proved that others, such as the Jenrich children and other members of the younger generations, had the ability to overcome the racism and discrimination inherent in the previous generations. This was revealed throughout the film to only mean overt racism had been overcome, as even the children made Toxi feel unwelcome. Also the final scene in which the Jenrich children were in Blackface illustrates that Theodor as a character is present to foil benevolent racism through his more aggressive Nazism. Furthering this suggestively post-racial agenda, Herta's and Robert's consideration of the possibility of adoption serves as a subtle push that reasserts the suggestion that racism was confined to the Nazi era, and as such, a thing of the past. This consideration is also a reference to the idea that Black children in Germany needed to be adopted, as seen in many discussions on brown babies.

Significance of the end of the film

At the end of Toxi, Toxi and Uncle Theodor's children put on a nativity play for the family. Although Toxi is originally supposed to be the Moor King, one of Uncle Theodor's children wants the role. Thus they paint the other girl's face black and Toxi's face white in order to symbolize a post-racial era and support the idea of the film that race is not something that people should discriminate and differentiate on. 
However, while the nativity play is in progress Toxi's grandmother brings Toxi's black American father into the house. With her face covered in white paint Toxi hugs her father for the first time and the movie ends. Of course, the assumption is that Toxi's father will take her "home" to America—Toxi will wipe the white paint from her face, and thus her Germaneness, and return to the country in which she belongs. This is problematic, because it shows that after all Toxi has been through to prove herself lovable to Germans, it actually means nothing, because she still does not belong. The movie still has to end with Toxi returning to America, showing that Toxi is not in fact German even though it has been her home her entire life.

Another important implication of the ending of the film is that Toxi's case mirrors the case of the "Brown Babies" (war children) from Germany after World War II. Biracial children were born as a result of the bringing of American and French troops into Germany during World War II. They were often referred to as "Rhineland B*stards" as well. These "Brown Babies" could not be assimilated into the white German nation, so they were excluded from German society. Consequently, Black Americans were more receptive to these biracial children so the African-American community sought to adopt some of these babies. Toxi's case is very rare, but existent in Black Diaspora histories.

Historical context
The film was set in Germany in the years following World War II. During World War II, the "Black Scourge"/"Schwarze Schmach" took place during the occupation of the Rhineland by American, French, and British troops in Belgium. Twenty-five thousand to forty thousand Black French colonial soldiers occupied Belgium, which resulted in the mixing of Black men with white German women. These "racial mixtures" were seen as an endangerment to the German racial purity and thus, the German national identity. At the time of the film's creation and theatrical debut, there were thousands of children living in Germany who had been fathered by African American soldiers and white, German mothers. The status and social position of these occupation babies was an especially troubling one for Germans, who wished to distance themselves from both the humiliation of postwar occupation by the Allied Forces and conceived of their society as "post-racial" despite conditions on the ground which indicated a still very racialized society. Despite German roots through their mothers, many popular discourses described these children as "not belonging and at risk in Germany" due to their skin color and the circumstances surrounding their conception.

Two distinct dialogues emerged in Germany regarding these "Brown Babies" and their prospects for living in Germany. The first posited that these occupation babies should be integrated into German society, and given the opportunity for equal rights and security in their homeland. The second position held that the children could not possibly be guaranteed a safe future in Germany and should thus be removed to the United States or somewhere else where their blackness would be more socially acceptable.

In this specific historical moment, Toxi acts as propaganda to promote Germany as a post-racial society. In Toxi, the film attempts to reflect the improvement of race relations in Germany in two distinct ways. First, the film falsely contends that the acceptance of Afro-Germans by white Germans is possible dependent on behavior; Toxi's exceptional manners and behavior suggest that Afro-Germans must perfectly perform for white Germans in order to be accepted. This component of Toxi contributes to Uncle Theodore's redemption, as he eventually learned to accept Toxi. Just as Uncle Theo was easily forgiven, Toxi suggests a type of post-WWII innocence for Germany. Secondly, Toxi promotes the idea that Germany is post-racial by using color-blind ideology; at the end of the film, Toxi and the two white daughters decorated themselves with blackface and whiteface. However, such color-blind ideology is dangerous because it ignores systematic racism. Thus, Toxi reinforces the idea that racial inequality is based on an essence of black people, rather than oppressive social practices. With these instances in mind, Toxi can be understood as German propaganda.

Instances of racism in the film
In the beginning when Toxi makes an entrance into the middle-class white household, one of the ladies asks "What's this?" to which another replies "A chocolate girl!" Toxi's arrival throws the multigenerational German family, representative of the German nation as a whole, into disarray and forces members to confront their own racism. Also demonstrating the objectification of Black Germans in white German society. 
Moreover, there is a scene in the movie where Toxi and Uncle Theodor's daughters are eating Mohrenkopf treats. Black Germans were sometimes referred to as this, since the treat has a dark chocolate covering. When Toxi meets the Roses, the family assumes that she is meant to be a humorous birthday surprise. The assumption that a young black girl is a prank is an example of German racist views of black people. Toxi is even fetishized by the seemingly progressive Mr. Robert, who exploits her image by using her blackness as something that is marketable as he incorporates it in the chocolate advertisement he is working on. Each time, the director cuts back to the carefree and unknowing Toxi for dramatic effect; her innocence and lack of understanding contrasts with the virulent racism that is projected onto her. The white characters in Toxi do not doubt or challenge their own morals. The film does not hold white people accountable for their own actions. Through this, a clear delineation of "good" and "evil" is created. Uncle Theodor's character is portrayed as the ultimate evil of the plotline while every other white character is shown to have good intentions. This fight of good against evil–Manichean dynamic– is popular among melodramas, and is an oversimplification of complex racial issues. This reductive representation is harmful because it communicates to the general public an inaccurate portrayal of the detailed intricacies of the struggles of Afro-Germans. Toxi is taken into the family, is reunited with her American father, and the story is resolved with a happy ending to appeal to the wide audiences of melodrama. What must be understood is that while Toxi's experience with struggling to fit in as a black German may be a common one, her acceptance into a white family and reunification with her black American father is not a luxury that many Afro-Germans are able to have. Additionally, the film's happy ending feels resolute in the sense that all of the plot's problems are solved.
 Some of the comments about Toxi exhibit racist ideology in Germany. Uncle Theodor states that he does not want Toxi around his children assuming that she might give them a disease. A female party guest calls Toxi a "child of shame."

Genre and audience

Toxi is considered a melodrama as it delves into female suffering (specifically Toxi's suffering) to appeal to the viewer's emotion. It also proves true to be a melodrama because it presents overreacted emotions and big exaggeration as a way to use emotion. Such emotions are an attempt to prove that blacks are human through sadness, depression and suffering. However, melodramas, and Toxi specifically, enforce the idea that black people are exceptionally strong given the help of white people. Even though this is an Afro-German narrative, this story is told by a white German director, Robert Stemmle, which may explain why Whites appear to be the heroes in this movie. Because Whites are initially responsible for "saving" Toxi and they all eventually embrace Toxi, it seems the intended audience for this is generally White.

Specific examples of the melodramatic elements in the film include the scene where Toxi is reciting a birthday poem after she arrives at the Rose household. It's as if she needs to entertain her new white family in order to be fed. Throughout the film, the character Toxi must continuously perform to be accepted into white German society. This constant performance can be seen as the only way that white Germans will deem Afro-Germans as "likeable" or useful in their society. This can be seen in the scene, like the one talked about earlier, where Toxi first arrives at the family's door and performs a poem for the grandmother.  Another melodramatic scene occurs when Toxi is seen doing something very similar when she is taken in by the caravan family. She is seen singing and dancing before they feed her and send her to bed. Finally, when Toxi's African-American father arrives, Toxi leaps into his arms and begins to count in English—that being the only English she knows how to speak. After her adventurous day with Uncle Theodor, it seems Toxi can do no wrong and deserves to go home to her actual family, although in reality, her assimilation to America would have been a difficult one as her father did not speak German and Toxi's English was minimal and barely useful for actual communication. Toxi is portrayed as the perfect child every time she is rewarded with something good or exciting.

References

Bibliography
 Bergfelder, Tim & Bock, Hans-Michael. The Concise Cinegraph: Encyclopedia of German. Berghahn Books, 2009.
 Biess, Frank & Roseman, Mark & Schissler, Hanna. Conflict, Catastrophe and Continuity: Essays on Modern German History. Berghahn Books, 2007.
 Davidson, John & Hake, Sabine. Framing the Fifties: Cinema in a Divided Germany. Berghahn Books, 2008.
 Fenner, Angelica. Race Under Reconstruction in German Cinema: Robert Stemmle's Toxi''. University of Toronto Press,  2011.

External links

1952 films
West German films
1952 drama films
German drama films
1950s German-language films
Films directed by Robert A. Stemmle
Films set in West Germany
Films about racism
Films shot at Wandsbek Studios
German black-and-white films
1950s German films